Aiden Anthony O'Brien (born 4 October 1993) is a professional footballer who plays as a forward for EFL League Two club Gillingham, on loan from Championship challengers Shrewsbury Town.  Born in England, he represents the Republic of Ireland national team internationally.

Career

Millwall
Born in Islington, London, O'Brien started his career in the youth system at Millwall and signed his first professional contract in 2010 on his 17th birthday. He made his debut for the club in the League Cup third round 5–0 defeat to Wolverhampton Wanderers, coming on as a substitute for Dany N'Guessan. On 1 January 2012, O'Brien signed for Conference South side Staines Town on a one-month loan.

A month later, O'Brien signed for Conference Premier side Hayes and Yeading on a one-month loan and immediately found himself playing games.

In May 2014 O'Brien agreed a new two-year deal with Millwall with the 20-year-old being highly regarded by Millwall boss Ian Holloway and is expected to feature more prominently in his first-team plans next season.

O'Brien made his first appearance of the season coming on as a substitute for Richard Chaplow against Southampton in the League Cup. The game finished 2–0 to Southampton. A month later he then made his first league appearance for Millwall in the 3–1 defeat to Birmingham City. O'Brien spoke of his delight of fulfilling a lifelong ambition when he made his league debut for Millwall and has dedicated the achievement to his father.

At the end of the 2017–18 season, his contract was extended by Millwall after the club exercised an option. He left Millwall at the end of 2019-2020 season, after his contract expired.

Sunderland
On 30 July 2020, O’Brien signed for Sunderland, on a two-year deal. On 8 September 2020 he scored his first goal for Sunderland in an EFL Trophy tie against Aston Villa U21s.

On 24 August 2021, O'Brien scored a hat-trick against Blackpool in the second round of the EFL Cup. His third goal came in the first minute of stoppage time to secure a dramatic 3–2 victory, earning him the "Player of the Round" award.

Portsmouth
On 31 January 2022, O'Brien joined EFL League One side Portsmouth on a free transfer. He scored his first goal for the club against Doncaster Rovers on 12 February 2022.

Shrewsbury 
Despite being offered a new contract by Portsmouth, O'Brien opted to sign a two-year deal with fellow EFL League One side Shrewsbury Town.

Gillingham (loan) 
On the last day of the January 2023 transfer window O'Brien signed for EFL League Two side Gillingham on loan for the remainder of the 2022–23 season.

International career
On 6 February 2013, O'Brien scored on his debut for the Republic of Ireland U21s against Netherlands in a 3–0 win at Tallaght Stadium.
O'Brien then scored his first competitive goal and his third goal for Ireland in 4–1 away win against the Faroe Islands.
On 15 November 2013, O'Brien bagged another international brace against Faroe Islands in a high scoring 5–2 win at The Showgrounds.

O'Brien has scored five times for the 21s and is two off Robbie Brady's all time goal scoring record with seven.

In September 2017 he was called up to the senior Republic of Ireland squad for 2018 FIFA World Cup qualifiers against Moldova and Wales.

On 11 September 2018, O'Brien scored his first senior international goal for Ireland on his debut in a friendly against Poland in Wrocław which finished 1–1. The goal would later be named as the 2018 FAI International Goal of the Year.

Career statistics

Club

International
Scores and results list Republic of Ireland's goal tally first, score column indicates score after each O'Brien goal.

Honours
Millwall
EFL League One play-offs: 2017

Sunderland
EFL Trophy: 2020–21
Individual

 EFL League One Player of the Month: October 2015
 FAI International Goal of the Year: 2018

See also
List of Republic of Ireland international footballers born outside the Republic of Ireland

References

External links

1993 births
Living people
English people of Irish descent
Footballers from Islington (district)
Republic of Ireland association footballers
English footballers
Association football forwards
Republic of Ireland international footballers
Republic of Ireland youth international footballers
Republic of Ireland under-21 international footballers
National League (English football) players
Millwall F.C. players
Staines Town F.C. players
Hayes & Yeading United F.C. players
Crawley Town F.C. players
Aldershot Town F.C. players
Torquay United F.C. players
Sunderland A.F.C. players
Portsmouth F.C. players
Gillingham F.C. players